Pinelands is a rural locality in the Toowoomba Region, Queensland, Australia.

Geography
The New England Highway passes through from south-east to north.

History 
In November 1893, the Pine Lands Estate was auctioned off in  blocks, a total of "9000 acres of the richest farm land in Australia".

Pinelands Provisional School opened on 17 October 1904. On 1 January 1909, it became Pinelands State School. It closed in 1960. It was at 6778 New England Highway.

St Catherine's Anglican Church was dedicated on Sunday 19 September 1909. It was on land donated by Chas Brewer. Its last service was held on 15 April 1951; 70 people attended and held a picnic after the service. The land was sold in 1953.

Pinelands Methodist Church opened on Sunday 21 July 1912. It has closed and been demolished.

Education 
Thee are no schools in Pinelands. The nearest government primary schools are Crows Nest State School in neighbouring Crows Nest to the east and Haden State School in Haden to the west. The nearest government secondary schools are Crows Nest State School (to Year 10) and Highfields State Secondary College (to Year 12) in Highfields, Toowoomba, to the south.

Amenities 
Pinelands Public Hall is at 6619 New England Highway.

References

Further reading 

 

Toowoomba Region
Localities in Queensland